Maidenhead Borough Police was the police force responsible for policing the borough of Maidenhead in Berkshire, England until 1889.

It had been established in 1836 as a result of the Municipal Corporations Act of 1835.  Maidenhead Borough Police was amalgamated into Berkshire Constabulary on 1 April 1889, as a result of the Local Government Act 1888.

Maidenhead is today policed by the successor to Berkshireshire Constabulary, Thames Valley Police.

See also
List of defunct law enforcement agencies in the United Kingdom

References

Defunct police forces of England
Constabulary